The 2013 Napa Valley Challenger was a professional tennis tournament played on hard courts. It was the First edition of the tournament which was part of the 2013 ATP Challenger Tour. It took place in Napa, California, United States between 23 and 29 September 2013.

Singles main-draw entrants

Seeds

 1 Rankings are as of September 16, 2013.

Other entrants
The following players received wildcards into the singles main draw:
  Collin Altamirano
  Ben McLachlan
  Dennis Novikov
  Tim Smyczek

The following players received entry from the qualifying draw:
  Greg Ouellette
  Thanasi Kokkinakis
  Jesse Witten
  Dimitar Kutrovsky

Champions

Singles

 Donald Young def.  Matthew Ebden 4–6, 6–4, 6–2

Doubles

 Bobby Reynolds /  John-Patrick Smith def.  Steve Johnson /  Tim Smyczek 6–4, 7-6(7-2)

External links
Official Website

Napa Valley Challenger
Napa Valley Challenger
2013 in American tennis
2013 in sports in California